is located in Yamanouchi, Nagano Prefecture, Japan. It is part of the Joshinetsu Kogen National Park (locally known as Shigakogen), and is located in the valley of the Yokoyu-River, in the northern part of the prefecture. The name Jigokudani, meaning "Hell's Valley", is due to the steam and boiling water that bubbles out of small crevices in the frozen ground, surrounded by steep cliffs and formidably cold and hostile forests.

It is famous for its large population of wild Japanese macaques (Macaca fuscata), more commonly referred to as snow monkeys, that go to the valley during the winter, foraging elsewhere in the national park during the warmer months. The monkeys descend from the steep cliffs and forest to sit in the warm waters of the onsen (hotsprings), and return to the security of the forests in the evenings.

However, since the monkeys are fed by park attendants, they are in the area of the hot springs all the year round, and a visit at any season will enable the visitor to observe hundreds of the macaques.

Jigokudani is not the farthest north that monkeys live. No (non-human) primate is known to live in a colder climate.

The Jigokudani monkey park became famous after appearing in the documentary Baraka.

Gallery

References

External links

 Jigokudani Monkey Park (Yaen-Koen) Official Site
 SNOW MONKEY RESORTS Official Site
 Official Yamanouchi Town Guide
 Enter the park through Google Street View
 Zeno's Guide to Jigokudani Monkey park
 Jigokudani Snow Monkey Live Cam and general info

Tourist attractions in Nagano Prefecture
Hot springs of Japan
Geography of Nagano Prefecture
Monkey parks
Articles containing video clips
Yamanouchi, Nagano